Jesús Silva-Herzog Flores, born as Jesús Silva y Flores (8 May 1935 — 6 March 2017) was a Mexican economist and politician affiliated with the Institutional Revolutionary Party (PRI). He served as secretary of Finance and Public Credit in the cabinet of President Miguel de la Madrid (1982–1986), as ambassador to Spain (1991–1994) and the United States (1995–1997), and as secretary of Tourism (1994) in the cabinet of Carlos Salinas de Gortari.

Biography

Silva Herzog was born as Jesús Silva y Flores in Mexico City to economic historian Jesús Silva Herzog and Josefina Flores Villarreal. He received a bachelor's degree in economics from the National Autonomous University of Mexico (UNAM, 1959) and a master's degree in the same discipline from Yale University (1962).

In 2000, he lost Mexico City's Head of Government election to Andrés Manuel López Obrador.

Silva Herzog died on March 6, 2017, at the age of 81.

Personal life

He was married to María Teresa Márquez Diez-Canedo and is the father of three children: María Teresa, Eugenia and  Jesús Silva Herzog Márquez.

References

Further reading
Castañeda, Jorge G. Perpetuating Power: How Mexican Presidents Were Chosen. New York: The New Press 2000.

See also
Latin American debt crisis

1935 births
2017 deaths
Mexican Secretaries of Finance
Mexican Secretaries of Tourism
Mexican economists
Ambassadors of Mexico to the United States
Institutional Revolutionary Party politicians
National Autonomous University of Mexico alumni
Yale University alumni
Academic staff of El Colegio de México
People from Mexico City
Ambassadors of Mexico to Spain
20th-century Mexican politicians